Alain Maurice Jacques Duhamel (born 31 May 1940) is a prominent French journalist and political commentator.

In 1963, Duhamel started working at Le Monde. He started giving talks on Europe 1 from 1974. He has also written in Libération since 1992, and in Les Dernières Nouvelles d'Alsace.

Duhamel has also hosted several television political broadcasts: À armes égales from 1970, Cartes sur table on Antenne 2 from 1978, succeeded by L'Heure de vérité, and eventually 100 minutes pour convaincre from 2002, as well as  Question Ouverte. During the French presidential election of 1995, Duhamel, along with fellow journalist Guillaume Durand, hosted the television debate between Jacques Chirac and Lionel Jospin.

Duhamel has also worked with RTL from 1999.

In 2006, Duhamel published Les Prétendants 2007, listing 20 likely contendants of the French presidential election of 2007, and notably ignoring Ségolène Royal. Duhamel persisted in denying that Royal was a likely contendant, even as she rose in popularity. He eventually included a chapter on the pocket edition of the book.

On November 27, 2006, during a talk at Sciences Po, Duhamel stated his intention to vote for François Bayrou. A video of the event was released on Dailymotion, and Duhamel was suspended from his activities at France 2 and RTL until the end of the campaign.

In 2009, Duhamel released La Marche Consultaire, a book which made comparisons between Nicolas Sarkozy and Napoleon.

Bibliography 
 La République giscardienne. Anatomie politique de la France, Éditions Grasset, 1980.
 La République de monsieur Mitterrand, Éditions Grasset, 1982.
 Les Prétendants, Gallimard, 1983.
 Le Complexe d'Astérix. Essai sur le caractère politique des Français, Gallimard, 1985.
 Le Ve Président, Gallimard, 1987.
 Les Habits neufs de la politique, Flammarion, 1989.
 De Gaulle-Mitterrand. La marque et la trace, Flammarion, 1991.
 Les Peurs françaises, Flammarion, 1993.
 La Politique imaginaire. Les mythes politiques français, Flammarion, 1995 (Académie française essay prize).
 Portrait d'un artiste, Flammarion, 1997.
 Une Ambition française, Plon, 1999. 
 Derrière le miroir. Les hommes politiques à la télévision, Plon, 2000.
 Les Prétendants 2007, Plon, 2006
 La Marche Consultaire, 2009

References 

1940 births
Living people
20th-century French journalists
21st-century French journalists
French television journalists
French columnists
French radio presenters
Sciences Po alumni
Writers from Caen
French male non-fiction writers
Grand Officiers of the Légion d'honneur